John Adams (died 1938) was a British architect, active in Uruguay at the end of the 19th and beginning of the 20th century.

Early life

John Adams was born in Brighton, UK, towards the end of the 19th century.  He attended school in Weybridge, and later studied architecture and construction in Bath and London at the Royal College of Art.  As a student he began to work with the London architects Jordon y Lowether.  After graduating from the Royal College, he was employed by the firm W.S. Lascelles & Co, remaining with them for five years.

Emigration to South America
Adams subsequently found employment with Maple & Co., a British furniture and upholstery manufacturer.  In 1890 he moved to Buenos Aires, Argentina, where the company had a subsidiary branch, to manage the interiors of Banco de Londres y Río de la Plata (Bank of London and Río de la Plata) in the capital but also Rosario and Montevideo.  He also worked on buildings owned by Banco Británico de la América del Sur in Buenos Aires y Montevideo.

Uruguay

Four years after Adam's arrival in Montevideo, he had his British qualification validated in Uruguay, and began and prolific period of building activity.  From the end of the 19th century through the first two decades of the twentieth century, he worked extensively in the construction of buildings, using both his own and also other architect's designs, managed by his firm.  Heavily involved in the English community of Montevideo, he also delivered residential projects, hotels and public transport facilities.  From 1910 onwards, he began collaborating with Carlos Sarthou, with whom he would later form a partnership.  

He left a considerable and important architectural legacy in Montevideo and beyond.  Recognized as a moderniser of Uruguayan architecture, he utilised 17th century Italian traditions popular in British neoclassical contemporary design of the time.  from the  One of his most notable works was Victoria Hall, built in 1897 to celebrate Queen Victoria's golden jubilee.  He participated in many of the English community's institutions, notably as Secretary of the British Hospital and president of the local union of architects and builders.  He returned to England on many occasions, perhaps the most important with the Director General of the Uruguayan Post Office to study British post offices and their offering with the aim of improving the Uruguayan service.  In the last years of his life he worked as a commercial attaché in the Uruguayan embassy in London.  He died in 1938 in London.

Selected works 

 British Hospital
 Edificio London París (also known as Standard Life)
 Victoria Hall
 Teatro Sala Verdi
 Montevideo Waterworks Company headquarters
 Hotel de los Pocitos
 Palacio Taranco
 London and Brazilian Bank
 British Embassy, Montevideo

References

External links 

Bibliography

PÉREZ SANTARCIERI, Maria Emilia,  Rincones de la historia. El inglés de los edificios, Diario "El País", Supplement. "El País Cultural", Montevideo 3/8/1990, N°42.p.4.

1938 deaths
British architects
British emigrants to Uruguay
British emigrants to Argentina
Alumni of the Royal College of Art
British expatriates in Argentina
British expatriates in Uruguay